10199 Chariklo  is the largest confirmed centaur (small body of the outer Solar System). It orbits the Sun between Saturn and Uranus, grazing the orbit of Uranus. On 26 March 2014, astronomers announced the discovery of two rings (nicknamed as the rivers Oiapoque and Chuí) around Chariklo by observing a stellar occultation, making it the first minor planet known to have rings.

A photometric study in 2001 was unable to find a definite period of rotation. Infrared observations of Chariklo indicate the presence of water ice, which may in fact be located in its rings. It is possibly a dwarf planet.

Discovery and naming
Chariklo was discovered by James V. Scotti of the Spacewatch program on February 15, 1997. Chariklo is named after the nymph Chariclo, the wife of Chiron and the daughter of Apollo.

A symbol derived from that for 2060 Chiron, was devised in the late 1990s by German astrologer Robert von Heeren. It replaces Chiron's K with a C for Chariklo.

Size and shape
Chariklo is currently the largest known centaur, with a volume-equivalent diameter of about 250 km.

Orbit 
Centaurs originated in the Kuiper belt and are in dynamically unstable orbits that will lead to ejection from the Solar System, an impact with a planet or the Sun, or transition into a short-period comet.

The orbit of Chariklo is more stable than those of Nessus, Chiron, and Pholus. Chariklo lies within 0.09 AU of the 4:3 resonance of Uranus and is estimated to have a relatively long orbital half-life of about 10.3 Myr. Orbital simulations of twenty clones of Chariklo suggest that Chariklo will not start to regularly come within 3 AU (450 Gm) of Uranus for about thirty thousand years.

During the perihelic oppositions of 2003–04, Chariklo had an apparent magnitude of +17.7. , Chariklo was 14.8 AU from the Sun.

Rings 

A stellar occultation in 2013 revealed that Chariklo has two rings with radii 386 and 400 km and widths of about 6.9 km and 0.12 km respectively. The rings are approximately 14 km apart. This makes Chariklo the smallest known object to have rings. These rings are consistent with an edge-on orientation in 2008, which can explain Chariklo's dimming before 2008 and brightening since. Nonetheless, the elongated shape of Chariklo explains most of the brightness variability resulting in darker rings than previously determined. Furthermore, the rings can explain the gradual disappearance of the water-ice features in Chariklo's spectrum before 2008 and their reappearance thereafter if the water ice is in Chariklo's rings.

The existence of a ring system around a minor planet was unexpected because it had been thought that rings could only be stable around much more massive bodies. Ring systems around minor bodies had not previously been discovered despite the search for them through direct imaging and stellar occultation techniques. Chariklo's rings should disperse over a period of at most a few million years, so either they are very young, or they are actively contained by shepherd moons with a mass comparable to that of the rings. However, other research suggests that Chariklo's elongated shape combined with its fast rotation can clear material in an equatorial disk through Lindblad resonances and explain the survival and location of the rings, a mechanism valid also for the ring of Haumea.

The team nicknamed the rings Oiapoque (the inner, more substantial ring) and Chuí (the outer ring), after the two rivers that form the northern and southern coastal borders of Brazil. A request for formal names will be submitted to the IAU at a later date.

It has been speculated that 2060 Chiron may have a similar pair of rings.

Exploration 

The mission would be designed to fit under the cost cap of NASA New Frontiers program, although it has not been formally proposed to compete for funding. The spacecraft would be launched in September 2026, using one gravity assist from Venus in February 2027 and Earth in December 2027 and 2029 to accelerate it out toward Jupiter.

See also

References

External links 

 37th DPS: Albedos, Diameters (and a Density) of Kuiper Belt and Centaur Objects
 Chariklo Photo (February 1999)
 Chariklo's orbit between Saturn and Uranus.
 Demonstration of how centaur 10199 Chariklo is currently controlled by Uranus (Solex 10)
 
 

Centaurs (small Solar System bodies)
Discoveries by James V. Scotti
010199
Named minor planets
010199
010199
19970215